The Immediate Geographic Region of Ituiutaba is one of the 3 immediate geographic regions in the Intermediate Geographic Region of Uberlândia, one of the 70 immediate geographic regions in the Brazilian state of Minas Gerais and one of the 509 of Brazil, created by the National Institute of Geography and Statistics (IBGE) in 2017.

Municipalities 
It comprises 6 municipalities.

 Cachoeira Dourada    
 Capinópolis  
 Gurinhatã   
 Ipiaçu   
 Ituiutaba     
 Santa Vitória

See also 

 List of Intermediate and Immediate Geographic Regions of Minas Gerais

References 

Geography of Minas Gerais